Karrapur is a census town in Sagar district in the Indian state of Madhya Pradesh.

Geography
It has an average elevation of 497 metres (1,630 feet).

Demographics
 India census, Karrapur had a population of 9,285. Males constitute 53% of the population and females 47%. Karrapur has an average literacy rate of 61%, higher than the national average of 59.5%: male literacy is 72%, and female literacy is 48%. In Karrapur, 18% of the population is under 6 years of age.

References

Cities and towns in Sagar district